List of Guggenheim Fellowships awarded in 1998

References

1998
1998 awards